is the 26th single by Japanese entertainer Akina Nakamori. Written by Takashi Matsumoto and Makoto Sekiguchi, the single was released on March 25, 1991, by Warner Pioneer through the Reprise label. It was also the third single from her fifth compilation album Best III. This was Nakamori's final release under Warner Pioneer.

Background 
The song was released in two versions for the 1991 film . The first one by Makoto Sekiguchi was titled "Tenkawa Densetsu Satsujin Jiken" and used as the film's main theme and released in his studio album . The second version by Nakamori was retitled "Futari Shizuka" and used as an image song for the film's trailers and commercials.

Shortly after the release of this single, Nakamori left Warner Pioneer following issues she had with the label. Due to various reasons, she was not allowed to record for other labels until 1993, when she signed with MCA Victor.

Nakamori has re-recorded "Futari Shizuka" for the 1995 compilation True Album Akina 95 Best.

Chart performance 
"Futari Shizuka" peaked at No. 3 on Oricon's weekly singles chart and sold over 483,700 copies. It was also certified Gold by the RIAJ.

Track listing

Charts

Certification

References

External links 
 
 
 

1991 singles
1991 songs
Akina Nakamori songs
Japanese-language songs
Songs with lyrics by Takashi Matsumoto (lyricist)
Warner Music Japan singles
Reprise Records singles